Duffau is a ghost town in Erath County, Texas, United States.

Photo gallery

See also 
List of ghost towns in Texas
List of ghost towns in the United States

References

External links
 
Duffau, TX at The Handbook of Texas Online

Ghost towns in Central Texas
Populated places in Erath County, Texas